Greg Delgado is a retired American soccer defender who spent two seasons in the Major Indoor Soccer League.

Youth
Delgado attended Stanford University, playing on the men's soccer team from 1976 to 1979.  He graduated in 1980 with a degree in psychology.

Professional
In 1979, the Houston Summit selected Delgado in the fourth round of the Major Indoor Soccer League draft.  He spent one season in Houston before moving to the San Francisco Fog for the 1980-1981 season.

References

External links
 MISL Stats

1958 births
Living people
American soccer players
Major Indoor Soccer League (1978–1992) players
Houston Summit players
San Francisco Fog (MISL) players
Stanford Cardinal men's soccer players
Association football defenders